The Premier Squash League (PSL) is an English professional squash league organised by the England Squash & Racketball, in association with Kit Kirby, which runs from October to April. Teams consist of four players: four men and one woman.

See also
 Squash in England

References 

Squash in England